Sand Lake (French: lac Sand) is a lake in the town of Kearney, Almaguin Highlands, Parry Sound District, Ontario, Canada. An unincorporated community of Sand Lake, Ontario could be found just north of Sand Lake prior to the amalgamation with Kearney in 1979. Sand Lake is also host to only one camp, and much of the shore of the lake is Precambrian rock of the Canadian Shield.  There are only a few occurrences of sandy beach around the lake shoreline due largely to runoff water erosion carrying sand from creeks from the surrounding elevated rocky terrain.  However, a good portion of the shallow waters around the shore are sand as the name of the lake suggests.

Sand Lake is part of the Magnetawan River system.  The river enters the lake at the north shore and flows out of the south end of the lake.

There are two islands in the lake.   Blueberry Island is located near the northern shore of the lake, close to the mouth of the Magnetawan River.  The larger Emerald Island is located in the west bay of the lake, west of Rock Point.

Image gallery

See also
List of lakes in Ontario

References

Lakes of Parry Sound District